Herbert Blair Neatby  (1924–2018) was a Canadian historian. Born on 11 December 1924 in Renown, Saskatchewan, he graduated from the University of Saskatchewan in 1950 and pursued graduate study at the University of Oxford and the University of Toronto. Neatby began teaching at Carleton University in 1964, received a Guggenheim fellowship in 1967 and was named a fellow of the Royal Society of Canada in 1977. He died on 11 March 2018 at the Ottawa Civic Hospital.

References

1924 births
2018 deaths
20th-century Canadian historians
Alumni of the University of Oxford
University of Toronto alumni
Academic staff of Carleton University
University of Saskatchewan alumni
Fellows of the Royal Society of Canada
People from Saskatchewan
Chevaliers of the Légion d'honneur
Presidents of the Canadian Historical Association